KRT28 is a keratin gene.